Nikiforovo is a rural locality (a village) in Ukhotskoye Rural Settlement of Kargopolsky District, Arkhangelsk Oblast, Russia. The population was 46 as of 2010.

Geography 
Nikiforovo is located 57 km southwest of Kargopol (the district's administrative centre) by road. Zaparino is the nearest rural locality.

References 

Rural localities in Kargopolsky District